Stewart's Melville College (SMC) is an independent day and boarding school in Edinburgh, Scotland. Classes are all boys in the 1st to 5th years and co-educational in Sixth (final) year. It has a roll of about 750 pupils.

The school is twinned with the Mary Erskine School (MES), an all-girls independent school approximately one mile (1.6 km) from Stewart's Melville College. Together the combined Erskine Stewart's Melville Schools (ESMS) have a co-educational Sixth Year and Junior School, the latter of which is split between the two campuses and caters for pupils from 3 to 12 years old. The two schools share a Principal, and most extra-curricular activities, such as performing arts, are run jointly. Both SMC and MES are managed by the Merchant Company of Edinburgh, which is also responsible for the co-educational George Watson's College.

History

Stewart's Melville College originated from the merger of two schools — Daniel Stewart's College and Melville College — in 1972 to become Daniel Stewart's and Melville College.  After the merger Melville's bright red trim replaced the dark red trim on the black Daniel Stewart's blazer for general use and the red blazer of Melville College was adopted for those awarded colours (for sporting and other achievements); recently use of the red blazer was limited to the head boy and his deputies, with colours being signified with a particular tie.

Melville College was founded in 1832 by the Rev. Robert Cunningham in George Street but soon moved to Hill Street in the centre of Edinburgh with a teaching emphasis on modern subjects, such as science, rather than classical subjects – unusual at that time. The school moved a short distance to 8 Queen Street which was purchased in 1853 and then to Melville Street in the city's West End in 1920. Originally named "The Edinburgh Institution for Languages and Mathematics", its name changed to Melville College in 1936 about the same time as the caps and blazers of the boys were changed to bright red.

Daniel Stewart's Hospital was opened in 1855 by the Merchant Company of Edinburgh. Daniel Stewart (whose wealth came from India and was Macer to the Court of the Exchequer), upon his death in 1814, left a sum of money and instructions that, once it had reached £40,000 it should be used to create a hospital for needy boys within the city. The hospital was located on the current Queensferry Road campus (designed by David Rhind). The hospital was transformed into "Daniel Stewart's College" in 1870. The school uniform from 1924 onwards was a cap with red and black stripes and a black blazer with red trim.

In 1974 the link with another nearby Merchant Company school, the all-girls Mary Erskine School, was formalised and The Mary Erskine and Stewart's Melville Junior School was formed.  Nursery to Primary 3 are housed on the Mary Erskine campus, with Primary 4 to 7 on the Stewart's Melville campus.  The sixth (final) form of both senior schools is coeducational.

In 2013, Stewart's Melville was voted the Scottish Independent School of the year by the Sunday Times newspaper and Mary Erskine School was voted the Scottish Independent School of the year in 2012. In 2014 the combined Erskine Stewarts Melville school, with over 2,700 pupils, claimed to be the largest independent school in Europe.

In 2014, a programme of improvement work on buildings of the junior school was announced, and as of 2018, work has begun.

In February 2023, it was announced by principle Anthony Simpson that the boarding house would close by July 2025, citing costs and the facility not being compatible with the school's vision for the future. The allocation of resources towards the boarding house was not sustainable, as at the time of the announcement, there were only 19 boarders, accounting for less than 3% of all pupils at the school.

Sport
Stewart's Melville College has won the Scottish Rugby Schools Under 18 Cup five times: in 1999 (in their first year of entering), 2006, 2011, 2016 and 2019. Stewart's Melville RFC, the successor to the Former Pupils Rugby club, play in the Scottish League Championship.

"Ravelston Sports Club", a large on-site sports centre opened in 2000. The sports centre is mainly used by pupils for physical education lessons and sports training (such as swimming, basketball, badminton, short tennis and table tennis) but is also open to members of the public for a monthly membership fee. There is also a school shooting range located at the Ravelston campus. Extensive rugby, cricket, hockey pitches and athletics facilities are also located at the school's sports grounds in Inverleith, two miles north of the school. The main stadium at Inverleith dates back to the 1890s and was the main ground of the Scotland national rugby union team until 1925.

In 2019 Stewart's Melville College won the Mitsubishi U18 cup - played at Murrayfield Stadium - against local rivals George Watson's College.

Tom Fleming Centre for Performing Arts (Formerly "Performing Arts Centre")

The school's main Victorian assembly hall was converted to the "Performing Arts Centre" between 2005 and 2007. This £3.5 million project, was paid for in part by donations from the parents of the schools current pupils and former pupils (some of the chairs have names of people who have donated in gold).  The Centre has 800 seats that fold back into the wall, providing a variety of possible configurations and was officially opened in 2007.  It is also available for use by the public and is used as a venue for the Edinburgh Festival Fringe.

In 2011 actor John Cairney unveiled the new name for the centre, "Tom Fleming Centre for Performing Arts", named after former pupil Tom Fleming, one of Scotland's leading broadcasters.

Carbisdale

Since 1965, the school has organised an outdoor education programme for the boys of SMC and the girls from MES in the third year. It takes place in the north of Scotland, based for over forty years at Carbisdale Castle Youth Hostel, Easter Ross, until its closure in 2011 required accommodation to relocate to Aviemore. After a campaign lead by a school pupil, Ewan Tracy, the programme was re-instated at the Carbisdale Castle. The camp was also abandoned in 2020 and 2021, due to coronavirus restrictions. It returned in 2022.

Examinations
Pupils at Stewart's Melville mainly sit Scottish Qualifications Authority (SQA) examinations, including (as of 2013) National 4, National 5, Higher Grade and Advanced Higher Grade levels.  The English GCE Advanced Level, examinations can also be sat in art and music. Almost all pupils go on to higher education.

Former Headmasters

Herbert James Liddle Robbie (1904–1964) headmaster of Daniel Stewart's from 1946 to 1964

Notable alumni

The school maintains a Former Pupils Club, which organises social events throughout the year.  There are branches throughout the UK and abroad.

Academia and science
 Thomas David Anderson (1853–1952) - astronomer who discovered many temporary and variable stars (novae)
 Professor James Barr (1924–2006) - a radical theologian who was professor at Montreal, Edinburgh, Manchester, Oxford, Princeton and Vanderbilt.
 James Bertram (Carnegie secretary) (1872–1934)
 Erskine Beveridge (1851–1920) - textile manufacturer, historian and antiquary
 Professor Henry Calderwood (1830–1897) - Professor of Moral Philosophy at Edinburgh University and Fellow of the Royal Society of Edinburgh
 James Ireland Craig FRSE CBE (1868–1952) - meteorologist (dux 1885)
 Professor Maurice Ewing CBE, FRCSEd, FRACS (1912–1999) - First professor of surgery at Melbourne University, Australia
 Sir William Tennant Gairdner (1824–1907) - Professor of Medicine at the University of Glasgow and President of the British Medical Association
 William Aitcheson Haswell FRS (1854–1925) - Scottish-Australian zoologist specialising in crustaceans, winner of the 1915 Clarke Medal 
 Andrew John Herbertson FRGS FRMS (1865–1915) - geographer and Professor in Geography at Oxford University
 Sir James Charles Inglis (1851–1911) - British civil engineer, President of the Institution of Civil Engineers and General Manager of the Great Western Railway
 Professor Tom W. B. Kibble, CBE FRS (1932–2016) - theoretical physicist, co-discovery of the Higgs mechanism and Higgs boson.
 Professor Arnold Maran (1936-2017) - surgeon, President of the Royal College of Surgeons of Edinburgh.
 Sir Peter Redford Scott Lang - Regius Professor of Mathematics at St Andrews University.
 George McGavin (born 1954) - entomologist 
 John Smith FRSE, PRCSEd, (1825–1910) - dentist who founded the Royal Hospital for Sick Children, Edinburgh and was Surgeon Dentist to Queen Victoria.
 Sir Fraser Stoddart FRS FRSE FRSC (born 1942) - chemist, Nobel Prize in Chemistry 2016, Professor of chemistry at Northwestern University, USA (supramolecular chemistry and nanotechnology), awarded Albert Einstein World Award of Science.
 Sir John Thomson-Walker, OBE, DL, FRCS, (1871–1937) - Hunterian Professor of Surgery at the Royal College of Surgeons of England and leading surgeon in the field of urology
 Ramsay Traquair FRSE FRS (1840–1912) - naturalist and palaeontologist, leading expert on fossil fish, awarded the Royal Medal by the Royal Society and the Lyell Medal

Media and arts
 Ian Stuart Black (1915–1997) - novelist, playwright and screenwriter
 Michael Boyd (director) (born 1955) - Artistic Director of the Royal Shakespeare Company.
 Tom Fleming CVO, OBE, FRSAMD (1927–2010) - actor and television commentator.
 Sir William Russell Flint (1880–1969) - watercolour painter and president of the Royal Society of Painters in Watercolours
 Stuart Henry (1942–1995) - popular radio disc jockey of the 1960s and 70s.
 Kheredine Idessane (born 1969) - sports broadcaster.
 Philip Kerr (1956–2018) - writer.
Alexander Moffat (born 1943) - artist, Head of Painting, Glasgow School of Art.

Law and politics
 Lord Brailsford (S. Neil Brailsford) (born 1954) - Senator of the College of Justice and Supreme Courts Judge 
 Sir Martin Chamberlain (born 1973), a High Court Judge of England and Wales 
 Sir William Young Darling MC, CBE, DL (1885–1962) - Member of Parliament for South Edinburgh and Lord Provost of Edinburgh 
 Sir Andrew Henderson Leith Fraser KCSI (1848–1919) - Lieutenant Governor of Bengal between 1903 and 1908
 Sir James Gibson, 1st Baronet (1849–1912) Lord Provost of Edinburgh and Member of Parliament for Edinburgh East
 Adam Gifford, Lord Gifford FRSE (1820–1887) - Scottish Advocate and Judge
 Robert McIntyre (1913–1998) - politician, leader of the Scottish National Party (SNP) and the SNP's first elected Member of Parliament. 
 J P Mackintosh (1929–1978) - academic and British Labour politician of the 1960s and 70s. Leading advocate of Scottish devolution.
 Sir Thomas Brash Morison (1868–1945) - Liberal Member of Parliament for Inverness, Solicitor General for Scotland, Privy Counsellor and Lord Advocate
 Sir George Touche 1st Baronet (1861–1935) - Conservative Member of Parliament and founder of one of the firms that created Deloitte Touche Tohmatsu
 Sir James Wilson (1849–1929) New Zealand Politician
 Paul Wheelhouse (born 1970) - SNP MSP for South Scotland, Minister for Business, Innovation and Energy in the Scottish Government
 Daniel Johnson (born 1977) - Entrepreneur and Labour MSP for Edinburgh Southern.

Sports
 Finlay Calder OBE (born 1957) - international rugby player and British and Irish Lions captain who played 34 times for Scotland.
 Jim Calder (born 1957) - Scottish and British Lions Rugby Player who played 27 times for Scotland
 Grant Forrest (born 1993) - European Tour Professional Golfer and Member of the 2015 Walker Cup Team.
 David Florence (born 1982) - Olympic canoeing silver medallist and world champion.
 Dario Franchitti MBE (born 1973) - professional racing-car driver who won the Indianapolis 500 race three times.
 William Laidlaw (1912–1992) - international cricketer for Scotland and Durham
 John Lisle Hall MacFarlane (1851–1874) - international rugby player and surgeon. He played for Scotland in the first international rugby match in 1871.
 Donald MacGregor (born 1939) - Olympic marathon runner.
 Finlay Mickel (born 1977) - Olympic skier, his result at the 2005 World Championships was the best result by a British man in the history of the skiing World Championships,.
Arthur Plowright (1913–1992) - first-class cricketer
Charles Scobie (1895–1965) - first-class cricketer
Jamie Stevenson (born 1975) - world champion orienteer.
William Turnbull (1879–1959) - first-class cricketer
Grant Weatherstone (1931–2020) - international rugby player who was played 16 times for Scotland.
 Doddie Weir OBE (1970-2022) - Scottish and British Lions international rugby player who played 61 times for Scotland. Charity fundraiser for MND research.
 Jake Wightman (born 1994) - International athlete. Gold medallist 1500 metres 2022 World Athletics Championships.
 David Wilkie MBE (born 1954) - only person to have been swimming champion at British, American, Commonwealth, European, World and Olympic levels at the same time

Military
 Lieutenant General Sir James Hills-Johnes VC, GCB (1833–1919) - was awarded the Victoria Cross for action in Delhi in the Indian mutiny in 1857
 John Alexander Cruickshank VC (born 1920) - recipient of the Victoria Cross in the Second World War.
 Major-General Mungo Melvin CB OBE (born 1955)
Religion
 The Right Reverend James A. Whyte, LLD, (1920–2005) - leading theologian, Professor at St. Andrews University and Moderator of the General Assembly of the Church of Scotland
 The Right Reverend Ronnie Selby Wright CVO TD JP FRSE FSAScot (1908–1995) - chaplain to the Queen, Moderator of the General Assembly of the Church of Scotland

Other
 Sir Ivison Macadam KCVO, CBE, FRSE (1894–1974) - Director General of the Royal Institute of International Affairs (Chatham House) and founding president of the National Union of Students
 Sir Robert Hogg Matthew OBE, FRIBA (1906–1975) - acclaimed architect and a leading proponent of modernism

References

External links

The Erskine Stewart's Melville Schools Website
Profile on the ISC website
Stewart's Melville College page on Scottish Schools Online

School buildings completed in 1855
Educational institutions established in 1972
Listed schools in Scotland
Private schools in Edinburgh
Member schools of the Headmasters' and Headmistresses' Conference
Boarding schools in Edinburgh
Boys' schools in Edinburgh
Diamond schools